Henderson Clinton Slemp (August 6, 1832 – January 11, 1901), nicknamed "Captain Henry", was a farmer, Confederate officer and Virginia politician who served in both houses of the Virginia General Assembly.

Early and family life
Born near Turkey Cove in Lee County, Virginia, to Sebastian Smyth Slemp (1810-1859) and his wife, the former Margaret Reasor (1811-1871), both of families long prominent in the region, Henry Slemp had a younger brother, Campbell Slemp, and two elder sisters, Nervesta Overton Slemp Flanary (1834-1914) and Alpha Slemp Habourn (1836-1893).

He married two or three times and had 18 children. He married his first wife Joannah Barron (1833-1863) on March 15, 1853, and their children were: Samuel Slemp (1852- ), Martha Slemp (1854-) Louis Hopkins Slemp (1856-1855), Huey Letcher Slemp (1858-1913), Adela Alice Slemp Flanary (1861-1947) and Bell Slemp (1863-). After her death, he married Malissa Habum (1842-1917) on July 16, 1864, and had children Elizabeth Eva Slemp Cox (1867-1945), Milton G. Slemp (1869-), Ulysses S. Slemp (1870-1940), Venus Melissa Slemp (1872-1891), Alpha D. Brahe (1874-1900), Martha Luna Slemp Bailey (1877-1952) and Patton Wise Slemp (1885-1961).

Career
Although his younger brother Campbell Slemp recruited a company of Confederate soldiers after the 1861 harvest, Henry Slemp did not enlist for another year, and he did so in "Harlan County, Tennessee" (presumably Harlan County, Kentucky) on December 1, 1862 by recruiting another company, which became Company S of the 64th Virginia Cavalry.

Captain Henry Slemp was elected to the Senate of Virginia in 1875 and served a single four-year term. He succeeded his superior officer during the war, Auburn L. Pridemore. The district boundaries were changed for the 1879 session, with Buchanan County removed and Wise County added. Henry C. Wood thus succeeded to the revised senatorial district, although his younger brother Campbell Slemp won elected to the Virginia House of Delegates as a Readjuster to represent Lee County in that election. Four years later, the politics of southwest Virginia remaining turbulent, Lee County voters elected Henry Slemp to represent them in the House of Delegates for one term beginning in late 1893. He succeeded  M. B. Spencer and was  succeeded by S. S. Surgener.

Death and legacy

Captain Henry Slemp died on January 11, 1901 (possibly in Washington, D.C.). He is buried in the Slemp family cemetery in Lee County, and was survived by his widow, several children and grandchildren.

References

1832 births
1901 deaths
Virginia state senators
Members of the Virginia House of Delegates
People from Lee County, Virginia
19th-century American politicians